The Mozarthaus Vienna was Mozart's residence from 1784 to 1787. This building in Vienna's Old Town, not far from St. Stephen's Cathedral, is his only surviving Viennese residence and is now a museum.

History

The house is located on Domgasse. It was built in the 17th century, originally with two floors, and redeveloped in 1716. Mozart rented rooms here from 1784, at which time it was also known as the Camesina House, after the family which had owned it since 1720. Since the original entrance of the house facing the Schulerstraße (the one Mozart used) was walled up to make room for a shop, the house has to be entered today from its rear in the Domgasse.

In 1941, the 150th anniversary of Mozart's death, his former rooms were opened to the public as part of "Imperial German Mozart Week", a National Socialist event intended to honour him as a "typically German" composer (in contrast to his polyglot lifestyle). In 1945 the running of the exhibition was taken over by the Vienna Museum. Despite its apparently attractive location near St. Stephen's Cathedral, visitor numbers at the so-called "Figaro House" were relatively modest, at around 80,000 per year.

In 2004, the city of Vienna's Wien Holding company undertook the total renovation of the Mozarthaus and redesigned it for visitors, and this was completed in time for Mozart Year 2006, the 250th anniversary of his birth. Following a complete refurbishment, the entire building (including the expanded basement) became a centre dedicated to the composer's life and work, incorporating the rooms occupied by Mozart himself. This process was overseen by the Vienna Museum. 

Today the Mozarthaus presents information about the composer in combination with historical exhibits and audio-visual installations, while the basement contains an events hall co-financed by the EU. 340,000 people visited the museum in its first three years.

See also 
 List of music museums

References

External links

 
 Wien Museum
 Mozart Museum Vienna (a video)

Museums in Vienna
Tourist attractions in Vienna
Buildings and structures in Innere Stadt
Museums established in 2006
Wolfgang Amadeus Mozart
Biographical museums in Austria
Music museums in Austria
Vienna Museum